Robert Prescott (c. 1726–1815) was a British soldier.

Robert Prescott may also refer to:

Robert William Prescott (1913–1978), World War II Flying Tigers ace and aviation entrepreneur
Robert Prescott (actor) (born 1957), American actor
Robert de Prescot (fl. 1339–1348), MP for Lancashire (UK Parliament constituency)

See also
Bobby Prescott (born 1931), baseball player